Guardians of the Galaxy Vol. 2: Awesome Mix Vol. 2 (Original Motion Picture Soundtrack) is the soundtrack album for the Marvel Studios film Guardians of the Galaxy Vol. 2. Featuring the songs present on Peter Quill's mixtape in the film, the album was released by Hollywood Records on April 21, 2017. A separate film score album, Guardians of the Galaxy Vol. 2 (Original Score), composed by Tyler Bates, was also released by Hollywood Records on the same date. Awesome Mix Vol. 2 was the United States' eighth best-selling album of 2017 with 600,000 copies.

Guardians of the Galaxy Vol. 2: Awesome Mix Vol. 2 (Original Motion Picture Soundtrack)

Background
By August 2014, Guardians of the Galaxy Vol. 2 writer and director James Gunn had "some ideas listed, but nothing for sure" in terms of songs to include in Quill's Awesome Mix Vol. 2 mixtape. In April 2015, Gunn said he felt "a little pressure for the soundtrack because so many people loved [the first film's soundtrack] and we went platinum and all that other stuff. But I feel like the soundtrack in the second one is better." In June 2015, Gunn stated that all of the songs for Awesome Mix Vol. 2 had been chosen and built into the script. One of the most exciting things for Gunn in selecting the songs for the album "was knowing I would be making bands that may have been forgotten suddenly be a topic of conversation." Gunn had hoped to include "She's Gone" by Hall & Oates in the film, calling it "one of the greatest pop songs ever written", but could not find a place for it, as with "Teenage Lament '74" by Alice Cooper In January 2016, Gunn stated that he had chosen an additional David Bowie song to appear in the film (after "Moonage Daydream" was featured in the first film) but had cut the original scene it was featured in. The inclusion would have made Bowie the only artist to be featured on both mixtapes. With Bowie's death however, Gunn hoped to find a way to include the chosen song somewhere else in the film as a "fair and appropriate" way to honor him, as Bowie was one of Gunn's idols. Gunn called the Awesome Mix Vol. 2 "more diverse" than the first one, with "some really incredibly famous songs and then some songs that people have never heard."

The film's trailers featured Sweet's "Fox on the Run", George Harrison's "My Sweet Lord", Fleetwood Mac's "The Chain", Jay and the Americans' "Come a Little Bit Closer", Bowie's "Suffragette City", and Parliament's "Flash Light", which Gunn noted were all being considered for inclusion on the Awesome Mix Vol. 2. "Fox on the Run" and Cheap Trick's "Surrender" had been considered for inclusion in the first film on Awesome Mix Vol. 1.

"Mr. Blue Sky" by Electric Light Orchestra (ELO) is included in the beginning of the film, which Gunn felt was "the perfect song to start the movie because it's really joyous, but there's a really dark underpinning to it," and felt it would go well with "the most hugely insane shot I've ever done". The sequence originally included the ELO song "Livin' Thing". Acquiring the rights to "Mr. Blue Sky" proved difficult for Gunn, noting Marvel "had to really fight to get the song, and I personally appealed to Jeff Lynne," which was made harder due to Lynne previously approving a song for the first film which ended up being cut. Gunn added that "The Chain" and "Brandy (You're a Fine Girl)" were the two songs that were "the most deeply embedded into the fibers of the film." Looking Glass lead guitarist and vocalist Elliot Lurie felt the inclusion of "Brandy (You're a Fine Girl)" in the film allowed for a deeper meaning to be explored from the song, noting "maybe, in retrospect, subconsciously [the song] was a metaphor. [The film] is certainly the use that has shined the brightest light on the song since it was originally a hit."

Skip Haynes, surviving member of Aliotta Haynes Jeremiah, "was so thrilled" that "Lake Shore Drive", a regional hit in the Midwest where Gunn grew up, was included and "rescued from historical oblivion", that he "recorded a new version incorporating the director's name into the chorus." "Guardians Inferno" is an original song for the film, co-written by Gunn and score composer Tyler Bates, "meant as a sort of Guardians take on Meco's disco Star Wars theme ["Star Wars Theme/Cantina Band"]." David Hasselhoff was chosen as the vocalist because he is one of Peter Quill's childhood heroes, and Gunn was a fan of Hasselhoff when he starred on Knight Rider. Edgar Wright, director of Baby Driver, consulted with Gunn before Vol. 2 released, to ensure the two films would not feature the same songs on their soundtracks.

Guardians of the Galaxy Vol.2: Awesome Mix Volume 2 (Original Motion Picture Soundtrack) was released by Hollywood Records on April 21, 2017. It was released on cassette on June 23, 2017, and on vinyl LP on August 11, 2017. The vinyl version is a deluxe edition featuring Bates' original score from the film. Marvel and Doritos partnered for their Rock Out Loud campaign to create "a custom-designed, limited-edition series of Doritos bags featuring a built-in cassette tape deck-inspired player that plays" Awesome Mix Vol. 2 and can be recharged. The custom bags were available to purchase on April 28, 2017, on Amazon.com. In addition, on May 5, 2017, Doritos hosted Rock Out Loud pop-up recording booths in New York and Los Angeles, where fans got the chance to sing one of the songs from Awesome Mix Vol. 2 and "have the opportunity to win various prizes, including the custom cassette player replica Doritos bags, concert and other event tickets, and free bags of Doritos."

On August 6, 2017, Marvel released the music video of "Guardians Inferno" to promote the home media release of the film. The 1970s-style video was directed by David Yarovesky, and features Hasselhoff alongside James Gunn, Chris Pratt, Zoe Saldana, Dave Bautista, Pom Klementieff, Karen Gillan, Michael Rooker and Sean Gunn. Stan Lee and Guillermo Rodriguez also make cameo appearances on the video.

Track listing

All songs—with the exception of "Fox on the Run", which is played in the trailer—are featured in the film. Also featured in the film was the song "Un Deye Gon Hayd (The Unloved Song)" by Jimmy Urine. It was written for the film and appears during the scene on Contraxia.

Commercial performance
The album debuted at number eight on the Billboard 200 chart with 34,000 units in its first week, almost all of which came from traditional album sales. It later peaked at number four, reaching 87,000 units, again nearly all traditional album sales. Guardians of the Galaxy Vol. 2: Awesome Mix Vol. 2 finished 2017 as the country's eighth highest-selling album with 600,000 copies, and has been certified Gold by the Recording Industry Association of America (RIAA). It was also the best-selling album on cassette tape in the United States in 2017, selling 19,000 copies.

Charts

Weekly charts

Year-end charts

Certifications

Accolades

Guardians of the Galaxy Vol. 2 (Original Score)

Background
Tyler Bates had returned to score the film by August 2015. As with Guardians of the Galaxy, Bates wrote some of the score first so that Gunn could film to the music, as opposed to Bates scoring to the film. Recording for the score began in January 2017 at Abbey Road Studios. Guardians of the Galaxy Vol. 2 (Original Score) was released by Hollywood Records on April 21, 2017, and on vinyl LP on August 11, 2017, as part of a deluxe edition that also includes Awesome Mix Volume 2.

Track listing
All music composed by Tyler Bates.

References

2017 soundtrack albums
2010s film soundtrack albums
Art rock soundtracks
Blues rock soundtracks
Concept albums
Tyler Bates soundtracks
Guardians of the Galaxy (film series)
Hollywood Records albums
Marvel Cinematic Universe: Phase Three soundtracks
Marvel Music compilation albums
Pop rock soundtracks
Punk rock soundtracks
Soft rock soundtracks
Soul soundtracks